Julie d'Aubigny (1673–1707), better known as Mademoiselle Maupin or La Maupin, was a French opera singer. Little is known for certain about her life; her tumultuous career and flamboyant lifestyle were the subject of gossip, rumour, and colourful stories in her own time, and inspired numerous fictional and semi-fictional portrayals afterwards. 

Her life loosely inspired the titular character of Théophile Gautier's 1835 novel, Mademoiselle de Maupin, in which she employs multiple disguises to seduce a young man and his mistress. Due to her relationships with men and women, some modern-day sources refer to d'Aubigny as bisexual or queer.

Early life

Julie d'Aubigny was born in 1673 to Gaston d'Aubigny, a secretary to Louis de Lorraine-Guise, comte d'Armagnac, the Master of the Horse for King Louis XIV. Her father, who trained the court pages, took care of her education teaching her academic subjects of the type given to boys but also trained her in fencing in which she gained competence from the age of 12, competing successfully against men. 

By the age of 14, she became Louis de Lorraine's mistress. That year, in 1687, the Count d'Armagnac arranged for her to marry the Sieur de Maupin of Saint-Germain-en-Laye, and she became Madame de Maupin (or simply "La Maupin" per French custom). Soon after the wedding, her husband received an administrative position in the south of France, but the Count kept her in Paris for his own purposes.

Youth
Also around 1687, d'Aubigny became involved with an assistant fencing master named Séranne. When Lieutenant-General of Police Gabriel Nicolas de la Reynie tried to apprehend Sérannes for killing a man in an illegal duel, the pair fled the city to Marseille.

On the road south, d'Aubigny and Sérannes made a living by giving fencing exhibitions and singing in taverns and at local fairs. While travelling and performing in these impromptu shows, La Maupin dressed in men's clothing but did not attempt to pass as male.

Her performances on stage attracted the attention of a young woman—the daughter of a local merchant. When the girl's parents hid her away in a convent, possibly the Visitandines convent in Avignon, d'Aubigny followed, entering the convent as a postulant. In order to run away with her new love, she stole the body of a dead nun, placed it in the bed of her lover, and set the room on fire to cover their escape. Their affair lasted for three months before the young woman returned to her family. D'Aubigny was charged in absentia—as a male—with kidnapping, body snatching, arson, and failing to appear before the tribunal.

D'Aubigny left for Paris and again earned her living by singing. In an inn in Villeperdue she met the young Comte d'Albert who mistook her for a man: they duelled, she won, he was wounded and she nursed him back to health. They became lovers briefly and lifelong friends. Near Poitiers, she met an old actor named Maréchal who gave her singing lessons. Together with a new lover, the singer Gabriel-Vinvent Thévenard, she went on to Paris where Thévenard was engaged with the Opéra on condition d'Aubigny should also be admitted. As a result, she began performing there when she was just 17.

Opera and adult life

The Paris Opéra hired La Maupin in 1690, having initially refused her. She befriended an elderly singer, Bouvard, and he and Thévenard convinced Jean-Nicolas de Francine, master of the king's household, to accept her into the company. She debuted as Pallas Athena in Cadmus et Hermione by Jean-Baptiste Lully the same year. She performed regularly with the Opéra from 1690 to 1694, first singing in major productions as a soprano, and later in her more natural contralto range. The Marquis de Dangeau wrote in his journal of a performance by La Maupin given at Trianon of Destouches' Omphale in 1701 that hers was "the most beautiful voice in the world".

In Paris, and later in Brussels, she performed under the name Mademoiselle de Maupin: by tradition, women who sang or danced with the Opera were addressed as "mademoiselle" whether or not they were married. In Brussels, she performed at the Opéra du Quai au Foin.

The many biographical accounts of her life, from the eighteenth century onwards, include stories of her winning several duels with the sword—on one occasion with three noblemen in the same evening, after she kissed a young woman at a ball—and beating the singer Louis Gaulard Dumesny after he insulted the other women at the Opera. She continued to wear men's clothes in public and had relationships with both men and women. 

Until 1705, La Maupin sang in new operas by Pascal Collasse, André Cardinal Destouches, and André Campra. In 1702, André Campra composed the role of Clorinde in Tancrède specifically for her bas-dessus (contralto) range. She sang for the court and before the King at Versailles on a number of occasions, and again appeared in many of the Opéra's major productions. She appeared for the last time in La Vénitienne by Michel de La Barre (1705).

After the death of her lover in 1705, Madame la Marquise de Florensac, with whom she had "dwelt in such affection they believed to be perfect", La Maupin retired from the opera and took refuge in a convent where she is believed to have died in 1707 at the age of 33.

Gautier's Mademoiselle de Maupin

Théophile Gautier, when asked to write a story about d'Aubigny, instead produced the novel Mademoiselle de Maupin, published in 1835, taking aspects of the real La Maupin as a starting point. Gautier named some of the characters after her and her acquaintances, although the plot and characters are invented, and it is set in the nineteenth century. The central character's life was viewed through a romantic lens as "all for love" and Gautier argues for "Art for art's sake" in its famous Preface. D'Albert and his mistress Rosette are both in love with the androgynous Théodore de Sérannes, whom neither of them knows is really Madeleine de Maupin. A performance of Shakespeare's As You Like It, in which La Maupin, who is passing as Théodore, plays the part of Rosalind playing Ganymede, mirrors the cross-dressing of the heroine. The celebration of sensual love, regardless of gender, was radical, and the book was banned by the New York Society for the Suppression of Vice and authorities elsewhere.

Opera roles created
Magician in Henri Desmarets's Didon (Paris, 1693)
Clorinde in André Campra's Tancrède (Paris, 1702)
Diana and Thétis in Campra's Iphigénie en Tauride (Paris, 1704)
La Felicite and Thetys in Campra's Télémaque, ou Les fragments des modernes (Paris, 1704)
Mélanie and Vénus in Campra's  Alcine (Paris, 1705)
Isabelle in La Barre's La Venitienne (Paris, 1705)

Portrayals
Apart from Gautier's Mademoiselle de Maupin, La Maupin has been portrayed many times in print, stage and screen, including:
Labie, Charles and Augier, Joanny (1839), La Maupin, ou, Une vengeance d'actrice: comedie-vaudeville en un acte Mifliez, Paris. (In French.)
Madamigella di Maupin (1966), film. (In Italian.)
Evans, Henri (1980) Amand and its sequel (1985) La petite Maupin, France Loisirs, Paris. (In French.)
Dautheville, Anne-France (1995), Julie, chevalier de Maupin J.-C. Lattes, Paris. (In French.)
Julie, chevalier de Maupin (2004), television mini-series. (In French.) 
Gardiner, Kelly, 2014, Goddess, Fourth Estate/HarperCollins, Sydney (in English)
La Maupin, the Musical (2017), debuting at 2017 Fresh Fruit Festival in New York City. 
Foster, Christopher (~2019), d'Aubigny, a 17th century bisexual disaster RPG. Indie-Tabletop role-playing game in which the players represent different aspects of D'Aubigny's personality. 
Revenge Song: A Vampire Cowboys Creation (2020), a play that premiered at the Geffen Playhouse in 2020 
Julie, an original opera on film by La Camerata (2020)
La Maupin, a folk punk musical by Fantasic Garlands Theatre at The Lion and Unicorn Theatre, London (2022)

References

Bibliography
 La Borde, J-B de (1780), Essai sur la musique, iii, 519 ff
 Campardon, E (1884), L'Académie royale de musique au XVIIIe siècle, ii, 177 ff
 Letainturier-Fradin, G (1904). La Maupin, 1670–1707, sa vie, ses duels, ses aventures

External links

1673 births
1707 deaths
Operatic contraltos
18th-century French women opera singers
17th-century French women opera singers
French duellists
Female duellists
French arsonists
Bisexual singers
French LGBT singers
French bisexual people
17th-century French LGBT people
18th-century French LGBT people